Patricio Julián Rodríguez (born 4 May 1990), sometimes referred as Pato Rodríguez  or Patito , is an  Argentine professional footballer who plays for Bolívar, in the Bolivian First Division.

Career

Independiente
Born in Quilmes, Rodríguez began his career on Independiente, joining the club's youth categories in 2000, aged 10. On 10 February 2008, he made his first team debut, in a 0–1 loss against Lanús. On 15 March, he provided an assist for Germán Denis' goal in a 3–1 win against Gimnasia La Plata. On 5 April, he was handed his first start, in a 1–3 loss against Colón.

On 30 August 2009, Rodríguez scored his first and second professional goals, against Atlético Tucumán.

Santos
On 20 July 2012, Rodríguez signed a four-year contract with Brazilian Série A club Santos. On 11 August, he made his debut for Peixe, scoring the first goal in a 2–2 draw against Atlético-GO.

On 31 July 2013, Rodríguez signed with Estudiantes de La Plata, in a season-long loan deal. He returned to Santos in the 2014 summer, but was sparingly used.

On 19 February 2015, Rodríguez was loaned to Johor Darul Ta'zim until November.

AEK Athens
On 20 July 2016, Rodríguez signed a two-year contract with Greek side AEK Athens, with an annual salary of €500,000. He made his official debut against Xanthi, providing his teammates with 2 assists and helping his team secure a comfortable 4–1 win.

On 14 October 2016, AEK's winger was suspended with a three-match ban for his unprofessional behavior against Diogo Figueiras in a 3–0 away loss in the derby clash against Olympiakos. On 5 November 2016, he scored his first goal in a 2–2 home draw against Atromitos. On 10 December 2016, he scored in a 4–0 win against Levadiakos. On 13 April 2017 Patito scored the winning goal in a 2–1 Greek Cup semifinals first leg away win against champions Olympiacos.
Despite the rumours from the beginning of 2017–18 season, it was reported Rodríguez would remain a member of AEK until the end of the season, when his current contract with the historic club expires.
Eventually on 8 December 2017, he released from the club by mutual consent.

Newcastle Jets
On 22 December 2017, Newcastle Jets announced signing Rodríguez as an injury replacement in the January transfer window, replacing their injured marquee Ronald Vargas. He scored on his debut for Newcastle Jets in a 2–0 win over rivals Central Coast Mariners. Following Vargas's recovery from injury and re-signing with Newcastle Jets, the club announced Rodríguez's release on 16 May 2018.

Career statistics

Honours
Independiente
 Copa Sudamericana: 2010

Santos
 Recopa Sudamericana: 2012
 Campeonato Paulista: 2016

References

External links
 
 
  

1990 births
Living people
People from Quilmes
Argentine footballers
Association football midfielders
Argentine Primera División players
Club Atlético Independiente footballers
Estudiantes de La Plata footballers
Campeonato Brasileiro Série A players
Santos FC players
Johor Darul Ta'zim F.C. players
Super League Greece players
AEK Athens F.C. players
A-League Men players
Newcastle Jets FC players
Primeira Liga players
Moreirense F.C. players
Argentine expatriate footballers
Expatriate footballers in Brazil
Argentine expatriate sportspeople in Brazil
Expatriate footballers in Malaysia
Expatriate footballers in Greece
Expatriate soccer players in Australia
Expatriate footballers in Portugal
Sportspeople from Buenos Aires Province